United States gubernatorial elections were held on November 7, 2006, in 36 states and two territories. The elections coincided with the midterm elections of the United States Senate and the United States House of Representatives.

Democrats won open Republican-held governorships in Arkansas, Colorado, Massachusetts, New York, and Ohio; and they defeated Republican incumbent Bob Ehrlich in Maryland while retaining all of their seats, including their lone open seat in Iowa. Meanwhile, Republicans held open seats in Florida, Idaho, and Nevada, as well as Alaska, where incumbent governor Frank Murkowski was defeated in the primary. Voters in the United States territories of Guam (then-Republican) and the United States Virgin Islands (then-Democratic, but term-limited) also chose their governors and voters elected a new mayor for the District of Columbia, the District's chief executive.

As part of the 2006 Democratic sweep, Democrats did not lose a single incumbent or open seat to the Republicans in any congressional or gubernatorial contest.

This was also the most recent cycle in which the Republican Party won governorships in California, Connecticut, Hawaii, Minnesota, and Rhode Island.

Major parties

The results of the 2006 elections gave Republicans 22 governors to the Democrats' 28, a reversal of the numbers held by the respective parties prior to the elections. There were 22 races in states that were previously held by Republicans, and 14 in states previously held by Democrats. Republicans held the majority of governorships from 1995 until 2007.

Election ratings

Race summary

States

Territories and federal district

Closest races
States where the margin of victory was under 5%:
 Minnesota, 1.0%
 Rhode Island, 2.0%
 Guam, 2.3%
 Nevada, 4.0%

States where the margin of victory was under 10%:
 Maryland, 6.5%
 Florida, 7.1%
 Alaska, 7.4%
 Wisconsin, 7.5%
 Maine, 7.7%
 Oregon, 8.1%
 Idaho, 8.6%
 Texas, 9.2%
 Iowa, 9.4%

Red denotes states won by Republicans. Blue denotes states won by Democrats.

Alabama

Alaska

Governor Frank Murkowski, suffering poor approval ratings, was not favored to win renomination. An August 8 poll by Rasmussen Reports showed that going into the primary election his approval rating was at 27%, while his disapproval rating stood at 72%. Former Wasilla Mayor Sarah Palin and former state Railroad Commissioner John Binkley challenged Murkowski in the Republican primary. Former governor Tony Knowles was widely considered the favorite to win the Democratic nomination. In the primary held on August 22, Palin won the Republican nomination for governor with 51.1% of the vote, Binkley received 29.6%, and Murkowski received just 18.9% of the vote. Knowles won the Democratic nomination with 68.6% of the vote; state representative Eric Croft, who received 23.1% of the vote, was his nearest competitor.

Palin campaigned on a clean government platform in a state with a history of corruption. An October 15 CRG Research poll had the candidates tied at 43%. An October 28 Rasmussen Reports poll showed Palin leading Knowles by a single percentage point.

Republican nominee Sarah Palin was elected with about 48% of the vote, a plurality.

Arizona

Arkansas

Governor Mike Huckabee was term-limited. The Republican Party nominated Asa Hutchinson, a former congressman, U.S. Attorney, DEA head, and Undersecretary of Homeland Security. The Democratic nominee was Arkansas Attorney General Mike Beebe. Beebe's campaign centered on what his campaign called his "Believe in Arkansas Plan", which outlined his plans for improving access to affordable healthcare, improving education, and stimulating economic development and job growth. Beebe led in most statewide polls, although his margin of victory in those polls varied wildly. Just days before the election, a Rasmussen Reports poll showed Beebe winning by just 8%, while a SurveyUSA poll showed him winning by 20%.

Democratic nominee Mike Beebe was elected with about 55% of the vote.

California

Arnold Schwarzenegger won the 2003 recall election and replaced Gray Davis. Despite his failed special election and budget cuts, Arnold Schwarzenegger seemed to be ahead in the polls against Phil Angelides. Schwarzenegger's aggressive push for environment-friendly legislation, his support for stem cell research, gay rights and opposition to sending the National Guard to the border has made him very popular among the voters. Republican incumbent Arnold Schwarzenegger was re-elected.

Colorado

The retirement of term-limited Governor Bill Owens revealed divisions among the state's Republicans. Republican Congressman Bob Beauprez, widely regarded as a conservative, was attacked by his primary opponent, former University of Denver President Marc Holtzman for compromising with Democrats in Congress. Beauprez became the nominee when Holtzman failed to submit enough valid signatures to qualify for the ballot, but the negative attacks they exchanged damaged Beauprez's campaign. The Democratic nominee was former Denver District Attorney Bill Ritter, an anti-abortion Catholic and a political centrist who could not easily be portrayed as a liberal. Ritter did, however, support Referendum I and oppose Amendment 43; conversely, the public defeated the former and passed the latter. Ritter's campaign was boosted when he was endorsed by a group of Larimer County Republicans. During the period of January through August, Ritter raised almost twice as much as Beauprez. According to an October 16 Zogby poll, Ritter led Beauprez 47% to 45%. An October 22 SurveyUSA poll showed Ritter leading Beauprez by a larger margin, 56% to 38%. Similarly, an October 22 Rasmussen Reports poll showed Ritter leading Beauprez, 51% to 39%.

Democratic nominee Bill Ritter was elected with 57% of the vote.

Connecticut

Florida

Governor Jeb Bush was term-limited. Florida Attorney General Charlie Crist, a moderate, won the Republican primary with 64%, defeating the Chief Financial Officer of Florida, Tom Gallagher, who received only 34%. Congressman Jim Davis of Tampa won the Democratic primary with 47% of the vote, defeating State Senator Rod Smith of Alachua, who received 41% of the vote. In addition to Crist and Davis, Reform Party nominee Max Linn also appeared on the ballot in the general election.

Crist came out of the September 12 primary with momentum, but as the election drew closer, polls began to show a more competitive race. An October 23 Quinnipiac poll October 23 showed Crist's lead down to 2%. However, an October 26 Rasmussen Reports poll had Crist leading Davis 52% to 41%.

Republican nominee Charlie Crist was elected with 52% of the vote.

Georgia

Hawaii

Idaho

Governor Jim Risch was elected Lieutenant Governor in 2002; in May 2006, he succeeded to the governorship when his predecessor, Dirk Kempthorne, resigned to become United States Secretary of the Interior. Before Kempthorne's appointment, Risch, a former Ada County District Attorney and state Senator, had committed to a reelection campaign for Lieutenant Governor, which meant the campaign for the governorship remained open.

Republican Congressman C.L. "Butch" Otter, a former lieutenant governor himself, was heavily favored to succeed Risch. On May 23 he easily won a four-way Republican primary, receiving 70% of the vote. In the general election, he faced newspaper publisher Jerry Brady, who was the Democratic nominee for the second consecutive gubernatorial election. Although Brady won the state's most populous county (Ada County, the location of Boise) in 2002, he was decisively defeated by Kempthorne statewide. He was expected to fare similarly against Otter; however, the race became fairly competitive, possibly due to a national trend towards the Democratic party.

Republican nominee Butch Otter was elected with 53% of the vote. Brady received 44%, making this gubernatorial election the closest in Idaho since 1994.

Illinois

Incumbent Rod Blagojevich proven to be an incredible fundraiser, and governed a relatively strong blue state. But recent opinion polling showed that his approval rating at a rather dismal 44%. Blagojevich initially had the advantage in the general election, leading his Republican challenger, state Treasurer Judy Baar Topinka by eight percentage points in polls, although not reaching the fifty percent "safe zone" for incumbents. In March, Topinka won the GOP primary by 38% to 32% over dairy magnate Jim Oberweis.  Meanwhile, a former Chicago Alderman named Edwin Eisendrath won a surprising 30% in the Democratic primary. During the election United States Attorney Patrick Fitzgerald was looking into the hiring practices of Governor Blagojevich.

An October 15 Rasmussen Reports poll showed Blagojevich dropping 4 points, to end with 44% and Topinka staying at 36%. An October 22 SurveyUSA poll had Blagojevich leading Topinka 44% to 34% with 8% undecided. However, an October 31 Mason-Dixon poll showed Blagojevich leading Topinka only 44% to 40% with 9% undecided.

Democratic incumbent Rod Blagojevich was re-elected. Green Party candidate Rich Whitney showed one of the best showings of a third party candidate in the 2006 election. Whitney received 361,336 votes, or 10% of the ballot share. This made the Green party an official major party in the state of Illinois.

Iowa

Congressman Jim Nussle was the Republican nominee, while the Democratic Party nominated Iowa Secretary of State Chet Culver, a progressive whose father was a U.S. Senator. An October 11 poll by Rasmussen Reports showed the candidates tied at 42% each. An October 19 Rasmussen Reports poll had Culver leading Nussle 47% to 44%.

The Democratic nominee, Chet Culver, was elected with 54% of the vote.

Kansas

Maine

In February 2006, Baldacci was given a mere 41% approval rating by the voters of Maine in one poll. But when the GOP unexpectedly nominated conservative state Senator Chandler Woodcock over the more moderate state Senator Peter Mills and former Congressman Dave Emery, Baldacci was handed a huge boost.

Polls consistently showed Baldacci with a small lead.  An October 17 Rasmussen Reports poll had Baldacci with 44% and Woodcock at 34%.  Meanwhile, a Voice of the Voter poll announced by WCSH on November 6, one day before the election, gave John Baldacci his smallest lead yet with only 36%, with Senator Chandler Woodcock 30% and the now leading independent Barbara Merrill 22%, more than doubling her share. Green Independent candidate Pat LaMarche polled at 11%.

Baldacci was reelected with 38% of the vote compared to Woodcock's 30%, with 21.55% going to independent Barbara Merrill.

Maryland

Bob Ehrlich's approval rating was 48%, which suggested a close election. Martin O'Malley, Mayor of Baltimore City, who was expected to run for governor almost as soon as the 2002 election was over, was initially expected to be a shoo-in for the Democratic nomination, but he was challenged by Montgomery County Executive Doug Duncan, who then unexpectedly dropped out of the race, citing a recent diagnosis of clinical depression, saving Democrats from a costly and potentially divisive primary.

A November 2 SurveyUSA poll had O'Malley leading Ehrlich 48% to 47% with 2% undecided. A November 3 Mason-Dixon poll has O'Malley and Ehrlich tied at 45% with 9% undecided. Democratic nominee Martin O'Malley was elected.

When Ehrlich unexpectedly beat his Democratic challenger, Lt. Governor Kathleen Kennedy in 2002, and became first Republican Governor of Maryland since Spiro T. Agnew, he was regarded by many as potential presidential candidate for 2008.

O'Malley defeated Ehrlich in the general election, 53% to 46%.

Massachusetts

With his approval ratings down, Governor Mitt Romney opted not to seek a second term. Romney endorsed his lieutenant governor, Kerry Healey, in her bid to succeed him. Healey was unopposed in the Republican primary. Deval Patrick, a former U.S. Assistant Attorney General who headed the Department of Justice's Civil Rights Division, won the Democratic primary with 50% of the vote against Thomas Reilly and Chris Gabrieli. Third party candidates included Grace Ross of the Green-Rainbow Party and independent Christy Mihos, a former Republican and board member on the state Turnpike Authority. Over the course of the campaign, Patrick was the victim of several smears by the Healey campaign, including reports of his brother-in-law's criminal history that were leaked to the press.

On November 7, Deval Patrick was elected with 56% of the vote. He became the first African American governor ever elected in the history of the state, and just the second in the nation's history (the first was Douglas Wilder, a Democrat from Virginia, who served as Governor of Virginia from 1990 to 1994). Patrick was also the first Democratic governor of Massachusetts since Michael Dukakis left office in 1991.

Michigan

Michigan, like many other Midwestern states, had been unable to take advantage of reported national economic and job growth. A string of plant and factory closings by big name companies such as General Motors in Granholm's state led to growing disapproval of her among voters. Opposing her was wealthy Republican businessman Dick DeVos. Throughout the race polls showed the election to be close, but in the last days Granholm pulled ahead.  According to a November 1 EPIC-MRA poll, Granholm led DeVos 52% to 43% with 5% undecided. A November 4 SurveyUSA poll had Granholm leading DeVos 51% to 45%. Ultimately, Democratic incumbent Jennifer Granholm was re-elected with 56 percent of the vote.

Minnesota

Pawlenty's approval rating was measured at 56% on September 21, 2006. In 2002, Pawlenty won the governor's mansion with only 44% of the vote, facing a strong challenge from DFL Party candidate Roger Moe and Independence Party candidate Tim Penny, a former DFLer himself.  Pawlenty has been criticized by some Minnesotans for budget cuts to programs such as MinnesotaCare to balance the budget (and controversial moves such as deferring required payments to the state's education and health care funds to later budget biennia to make the budget appear balanced when it was actually not).  Pawlenty faces another strong DFL challenge this year in state Attorney General Mike Hatch, who fended off a liberal primary challenge from State Senator Becky Lourey. Pawlenty and Hatch were virtually neck and neck, with between 40-45% support for both candidates as recently as September, until the Mark Foley scandal hit the papers late that month, and 5-6% for Independence Party candidate Peter Hutchinson.

An October 23 SurveyUSA poll has Hatch leading Pawlenty 45% to 44% and Hutchinson with 7% . A November 1 Saint Cloud Times poll has Hatch at 46% and Pawlenty at 36%. Republican incumbent Tim Pawlenty was re-elected.

Nebraska

Nevada

Governor Kenny Guinn, a moderate Republican, was term-limited. His retirement resulted in competitive primaries in both parties.  The Democratic nominee was State Senate Minority Leader Dina Titus, who won the primary with 54% of the vote over Henderson mayor Jim Gibson. The Republican nominee was Congressman Jim Gibbons, who won the primary with 48% of the vote, defeating state senator Bob Beers and Lieutenant Governor Lorraine Hunt.  Gibbons, who then represented Nevada's 2nd congressional district, had a strong base in northern Nevada. Titus had a strong base in the Las Vegas Valley due to her legislative and education careers. An October 17 Rasmussen Reports poll put Gibbons ahead of Titus with a 51% to 43% lead. Polls in late October conducted by Mason-Dixon and Research 2000 indicated that Gibbons was on track to win the election.

Republican nominee Jim Gibbons was elected with 48% of the vote, a plurality. Titus received 44% of the vote and Christopher H. Hansen, the nominee of the Independent American Party of Nevada, received about 3%.

New Hampshire

New Mexico

New York

Governor George Pataki, a moderate Republican, opted not to seek a fourth term in office. Without an incumbent in the race, the Democratic nominee was heavily favored to win the election. New York Attorney General Eliot Spitzer won the Democratic primary with 81% of the vote, defeating Nassau County Executive Tom Suozzi. As attorney general, Spitzer became well known for prosecuting cases relating to corporate white collar crime, securities fraud, internet fraud and environmental protection.  The Republican nominee was attorney John Faso, a former New York State Assembly minority leader. Throughout the race, polls showed Spitzer defeating Faso by a large margin.

Democratic nominee Eliot Spitzer was elected in a landslide, winning 58 out of the state's 62 counties and taking 65.3% of the vote.

Ohio

Term-limited incumbent Governor Bob Taft was viewed as one of the most unpopular Governors in the history of Ohio. Polls showed his approval rating in the vicinity of 10% to 25%.
Congressman Ted Strickland won the Democratic primary with 79% of the vote, defeating state representative Bryan Flannery. The Republican primary, between Ohio Secretary of State Ken Blackwell and Ohio Attorney General Jim Petro, was more competitive by far. Petro came under fire for switching positions on same-sex marriage and abortion, as well as allegedly taking business from lawyers who refused to give him campaign contributions. Blackwell and Petro also split over proposals to reduce state spending. Blackwell ultimately won the primary with 56% of the vote.

Blackwell was not a close ally of disgraced Governor Taft, but Taft's unpopularity still damaged his campaign. The negativity of the Republican primary also damaged Blackwell's general election campaign.  In addition, in 2006 there was a nationwide trend towards the Democratic Party.  An October 6 poll by Rasmussen Reports showed that Strickland led by 52% to 40%, a decline from September.  By contrast, an October 12 SurveyUSA poll had Strickland leading Blackwell 60% to 32%.

Democratic nominee Ted Strickland was elected with 60% of the vote. He became the first Democratic Governor of Ohio since Dick Celeste.

Oklahoma

Oregon

Democratic Governor Ted Kulongoski was elected in 2002 barely defeating former State Representative Kevin Mannix. Kulongoski leads his challenger, former Portland Public School Board member Ron Saxton 51% to 44%. Oregon has not elected a Republican as governor since 1982, when Kulongoski lost to then-Governor Victor Atiyeh. Democratic incumbent Ted Kulongoski was re-elected.

Pennsylvania

Rhode Island

Polling in the race showed Donald Carcieri,  Republican governor in one of the most liberal states in the country, running even with his Democratic challenger, Lieutenant Governor Charles J. Fogarty. Carcieri was re-elected with 51% of the vote.

South Carolina

South Dakota

Tennessee

Texas

Challenges from two popular independents, coupled with Perry's mediocre approval ratings, made the race interesting. Populist state Comptroller Carole Keeton Strayhorn decided to defect from the GOP and run against Perry, her bitter political foe, as an independent. Six weeks after the announcement of her candidacy, she moved to within single digits of Perry in polls. In addition to Perry and Strayhorn, former Congressman Chris Bell ran as the Democratic candidate, with country singer and Texas icon Kinky Friedman as another independent. This resulted in a peculiar four-way race (technically, a six-way race including the Libertarian candidate and a write-in candidate) in which no run-off would take place. Perry was elected to a second full term with just 39% of the vote.

Vermont

Wisconsin

In 2002, Doyle was elected with only 45 percent of the vote because of an unusually strong challenge from the Libertarian party. Although his early 2006 approval rating was a mildly unfavorable 45 percent, he led both Republican challengers, Milwaukee County Executive Scott Walker and Congressman Mark Green by six to nine points in polls; he has not been able to poll greater than fifty percent.  Green got a big break when Walker dropped out of the race. And more recent polls show that Green has pulled even.  Wisconsin is a swing state in the strongest sense, with George W. Bush losing the state by some 5,700 votes in 2000 and around 12,400 votes in 2004, although they hadn't voted for a Republican for president since 1984, and they hadn't had a Republican senator since 1993. An October 18 Rasmussen Reports poll has Doyle leading Green 48% to 44% and an October 31 Research 2000 poll has Doyle leading Green 50% to 44%. Democratic incumbent Jim Doyle was re-elected.

Wyoming

Territories and federal district

District of Columbia

Guam

In the U.S. territory of Guam, in the western Pacific Ocean, Republican Governor Felix P. Camacho was challenged by Democrat Robert Underwood. A former Guam Delegate-at-Large in the U.S. House of Representatives, Underwood had previously represented Guam from 1993 to 2003.  The race was a rematch of the 2002 gubernatorial election in which Camacho handily defeated Underwood and won his first term in office by 10 points (see Politics of Guam). However, the race was significantly more close and competitive in 2006, with Camacho narrowly winning reelection by a 2-point margin over Underwood.

U.S. Virgin Islands

See also
2006 United States elections
2006 United States Senate elections
2006 United States House of Representatives elections

Notes

References

External links
Major Problems At Polls Feared, Dan Balz and Zachary A. Goldfarb, The Washington Post, September 17, 2006